555 California Street, formerly Bank of America Center, is a 52-story  skyscraper in San Francisco, California. It is the fourth tallest building in the city as of February 2021, and in 2013 was the largest by floor area. Completed in 1969, the tower was the tallest building west of the Mississippi River until the completion of the Transamerica Pyramid in 1972, and the world headquarters of Bank of America until the 1998 merger with NationsBank, when the company moved its headquarters to the Bank of America Corporate Center in Charlotte, North Carolina. It is currently owned by Vornado Realty Trust and The Trump Organization.

Background

Colloquially known as "Triple Five" and/or "Triple Nickel", 555 California Street was meant to display the wealth, power, and importance of Bank of America. Design was by Wurster, Bernardi and Emmons and Skidmore, Owings and Merrill, with architect Pietro Belluschi consulting; structural engineering was by the San Francisco firm H. J. Brunnier Associates. It was the 75th tallest building in the United States upon completion, one foot taller than One Worldwide Plaza in New York City and just 1 foot shorter than the 68th tallest building in the US, which is also owned by Bank of America, the Bank of America Center in Houston, Texas at 780 ft (238 m), and just 2 feet shorter than the 67th tallest building in the US, 30 Hudson Street in Jersey City, New Jersey at 781 ft (238 m). Some sites round the heights of all four buildings to 780 ft (238 m) making those four buildings tied as the 67th tallest buildings in the country. As of February 2021, 555 California Street is the 89th tallest building in the United States, and the 103rd tallest in North America.

The skyscraper has thousands of bay windows, meant to improve the rental value and to symbolize the bay windows common in San Francisco residential real estate. The irregular cutout areas near the top of the building were designed to suggest the Sierra Nevada. At the north side of the skyscraper is a broad plaza named in honor of Bank of America founder A.P. Giannini.

In the plaza the 200-ton black Swedish granite sculpture "Transcendence" by Masayuki Nagare is known as the "Banker's Heart". Nearly the entire block—the skyscraper, the banking hall, the plaza, the stairways, and the sidewalks—is clad in costly polished or rough carnelian granite. A restaurant, the "Carnelian Room", was on the 52nd floor. The elevator to this restaurant is one of the few publicly accessible high-speed elevators in San Francisco. The restaurant closed at midnight New Year's Eve 2009.

With the Transamerica Pyramid, 555 California Street shows the direction San Francisco's downtown was moving during the 1960s before campaigns against high-rise buildings in the 1970s and 1980s forced development to move south of Market Street. With its top spire, the Transamerica Pyramid is taller, but 555 California has the higher habitable space.

In April 2018, the United States Geological Survey included 555 California Street in a list of 39 high-rise buildings in San Francisco constructed during a period when welding techniques were employed that may jeopardize structural integrity during a strong earthquake.  

A 70 percent interest was acquired by Vornado Realty Trust from foreign investors in March 2007 with a 30 percent limited partnership interest still owned by The Trump Organization In 2019, the building generated $86 million in net operating income ($60 million going to Vornado and $26 million to Trump Organization), and it had $543 million of debt attached to it in 2020. Trump's stake in 555 California Street is one of his largest holdings as of 2020. Forbes estimated in 2020 that Trump owes $162 million to an unknown creditor for this object alone; the loan comes due in 2021. At least one tenant in this building whose rent benefits Trump, the Qatar Investment Authority, is an empty office as of 2020. On May 19, 2021, Trump announced that a $1.2B loan had closed on the property at an interest rate of 2% annualized.

Major tenants

AllianceBernstein
Bank of America
Bank of India
Barclays Capital
Centerview Partners
Dodge & Cox
EY-Parthenon
Fenwick & West
Foley & Lardner
Goldman Sachs
Jones Day
Kirkland & Ellis
KKR Financial
McKinsey & Company
Microsoft
Morgan Stanley
Qatar Investment Authority
Robert W. Baird & Co.
Sandler O'Neill + Partners
Scality
Servcorp
Sidley Austin LLP
UBS AG
Wells Fargo Advisors

In popular culture
Since the opening of the building in 1969, it has been purportedly haunted with unexplained activity happening throughout the building such as moving cold air spots, landline phones lifting the receivers by themselves, and files and paperwork flying off shelves.

In 1971, 555 California Street appeared at the beginning of the film Dirty Harry, where it is the roof from which Scorpio snipes a woman in the now-closed pool atop what is now the Hilton Financial District hotel on Kearny Street. The film shows panoramic views of San Francisco from the roof of the building. In 1974, 555 California Street was again used for a box-office hit, this time in Irwin Allen's blockbuster The Towering Inferno, in which the outside plaza substituted for that of the film's fictional skyscraper, the infamous Glass Tower which on the night of its dedication catches fire.  Many scenes were also filmed in the interior ground-floor lobby. The granite stairs coming up from California Street to the A.P. Giannini plaza were used for several key specific scenes including the opening dedication ceremony, the arrival of fire trucks and the final scene on the steps with the characters played by Paul Newman, Steve McQueen and Faye Dunaway. The rooftop setting of the building used in Dirty Harry was also used a decade later in the Chuck Norris film An Eye for an Eye (1981). The building can also be seen under construction in the 1968 film Bullitt. The building is featured as a landmark in the 2003 video game SimCity 4, under its previous name.

See also

 List of tallest buildings in San Francisco
List of tallest buildings in the United States

References

External links

 

Office buildings completed in 1969
Bank of America buildings
Skyscraper office buildings in San Francisco
Pietro Belluschi buildings
Skidmore, Owings & Merrill buildings
Financial District, San Francisco
Reportedly haunted locations in San Francisco